The 1915 Detroit Heralds season was the 11th season for the Detroit Heralds, an independent American football team. Led by coach Bill Marshall, the team compiled a 7–1–1 record.

Blake Miller and Neno DaPrato, college stars at Michigan Agricultural College (MAC), joined the Heralds after MAC's season concluded in mid-November.

Schedule

Players
 Neno DaPrato - halfback
 Pat Dunne - fullback
 Norm Glockson - end
 Kelly - halfback
 Latham - quarterback
 Blake Miller - end
 Mitchell - guard
 Nedeau - end
 Newashe - guard
 Pierce - guard
 H. Schlee - tackle
 G. Shields - tackle
 R. "Dick" Shields - end and captain
 Archie "Dutch" Stewart - center
 Perce Wilson - halfback/quarterback

References 

Detroit Heralds seasons
Detroit Heralds